Valentin Petrovich Mazikin (17 December 1945 – 21 January 2022) was a Russian politician. He served as acting governor of Kemerovo Oblast from 25 January to 4 May 2001 and was then first deputy governor from 2001 to 2013. He died on 21 January 2022, at the age of 76.

References

1945 births
2022 deaths
20th-century Russian politicians
21st-century Russian politicians
Governors of Kemerovo Oblast